Kelmti Horra ("My Word is Free") is the debut studio album by Tunisian protest singer Emel Mathlouthi. It was released on January 24, 2012. The title track was written by Tunisian writer Amine al-Ghozzi and became an important protest song in the Tunisian and Egyptian revolutions.

Track listing

Personnel
Emel Mathlouthi, guitar, lead vocals and backing vocals
Amine alghozzi, lyrics
Zied Zouari, violin
Séverine Morfin, viola
Valentin Ceccaldi, cello
Imed Alibi, djembe, shakers
Vanesa Garcia, bombo
Jonathan Giovannelli, balafon
Sana Sassi, backing vocals
Jelila Bouraoui, backing vocals
Christine Audat, backing vocals
Amine Metani, backing vocals
Ahmed Nouisser, backing vocals

Reception

The album was received positively. Neil Spencer of The Observer called Mathlouthi "a powerful new voice" and "a world diva with a difference", describing the album as twisting together "Arabic roots with western flavours" including rock and trip-hop.

Music News describes Kelmti Horra as "a work of haunting and melodramatic beauty" with "an intoxicating and intriguing sound". Mathlouthi was called the "Voice of Tunisian Revolution" after the release of the song.

References

2012 debut albums
Emel Mathlouthi albums
Arabic-language albums